Grace Reformed Church (Grace United Church of Christ - Akron, Ohio) is a historic church at 172 W. Bowery Street in Akron, Ohio.

It was built in 1926 and added to the National Register in 1984.

The property was purchased by Akron Children's Hospital and the building demolished in 2016.

References

United Church of Christ churches in Ohio
Churches on the National Register of Historic Places in Ohio
Romanesque Revival church buildings in Ohio
Churches completed in 1926
Churches in Akron, Ohio
Churches in Summit County, Ohio
National Register of Historic Places in Summit County, Ohio